The Peaster Independent School District is a school district based in the unincorporated community of Peaster in Parker County, Texas (USA).

Schools
The district has three schools, namely
Peaster High School
Peaster Middle School
Peaster Elementary School

Mascot
The high school, middle school, and elementary all use the greyhound as their mascot.

Academic Status
In 2009, the school district was rated "recognized" by the Texas Education Agency.

See also
List of school districts in Texas

References

External links

School districts in Parker County, Texas